The Nerve, was a 24-hour live radio format produced by Cumulus Media Networks (through Cumulus Media). This satellite-driven format aired the latest Active rock music design to target today's 18-34 rock listeners. Unlike traditional rock stations and networks, The Nerve personalities were rock music core listeners who happened to be on the radio, instead of the DJs themselves.

Cumulus Media Networks' predecessors Satellite Music Networks and ABC Radio Networks distributed the Z Rock national service and was seen as one of the Rock outlets that laid the groundwork for the emerging Active Rock format.

For reasons unknown, "The Nerve" has ceased broadcasting in 2013. Former affiliate KTUM in Tatum, New Mexico continues to use the "Nerve" brand though it is now programmed locally.

Sources
Citadel Media - Music Radio Formats

Defunct radio networks in the United States

Radio stations established in 2010 
Radio stations disestablished in 2013
Defunct radio stations in the United States